Africville Suite is an album by Canadian jazz pianist Joe Sealy, which was released in 1996 by Sea Jam. It won the 1997 Juno Award for Best Contemporary Jazz Album.

References 

1996 albums
Juno Award for Contemporary Jazz Album of the Year albums